Shahabaddin Bimeghdar (born 1953) is an Iranian reformist politician.  He was born in Varzaqan, East Azerbaijan Province. He is a member of the tenth Islamic Consultative Assembly from the electorate of Tabriz, Osku and Azarshahr. In the past he was representative Varzeghan in Parliament for first and second terms.

References

External links
 Shahabaddin Bimegdar Website

People from East Azerbaijan Province
Living people
1953 births
Members of the 10th Islamic Consultative Assembly
Iranian reformists
Iran University of Science and Technology alumni
Deputies of Tabriz, Osku and Azarshahr
Deputies of Varzaqan
Will of the Iranian Nation Party politicians